Ignatia can refer to:
 Gnatia, a city of the Peucetii, a tribe in ancient Italy
 a feminine version of the given name Ignatius
 plants belonging to the  species Strychnos ignatii, and products derived from them, such as 
 Ignatia amara, a homoeopathic remedy